Empress Xiaocigao (18 July 1332 – 23 September 1382), commonly known as Empress Ma, was a Chinese empress consort of the Ming dynasty, married to the Hongwu Emperor and acting as his political adviser, exerting a large amount of influence during his reign.

Early life
Ma was from a poor background, born in Suzhou (宿州). Her personal name was known as Ma Xiuying in legends and operas, but this was never mentioned in any official records, including the History of Ming. It is noted that she did not have bound feet, which most women above the working class had in contemporary China. All that is known of her parentage is that her mother, who died when she was young, was surnamed Zheng, and that her father had fled with her to Dingyuan (in modern-day Anhui Province) after he had killed someone.

Her father came into contact with and befriended the founder of the Red Turban army, Guo Zixing, who was both affluent and influential. He took Ma in and educated her, and adopted her when her father died. In 1352, he married her to one of his officers, Zhu Yuanzhang, the future Hongwu Emperor.

Ma would accompany her husband on his campaigns, caring for and supporting him, while also being actively involved in political and military affairs, as well as managing his own affairs. One example of her involvement was when Zhu Yuanzhang took his forces across the Yangtze River to engage Yuan soldiers, leaving Ma to comfort the families of the soldiers left in Hezhou (in present-day Anhui Province). She encouraged the forces that remained with her to defend their city.

In 1363, during the Battle of Lake Poyang, the future empress was a beacon of strength and resolve during a widespread panic that had developed with the oncoming forces of rival Chen Youliang, who was also rebelling against the Yuan and whose forces almost matched those of Zhu Yuanzhang in size and strength. Ma distributed valuable goods to the soldiers to encourage them to continue fighting.

Empress

When Zhu Yuanzhang became emperor in 1368, he named Ma as his empress. In spite of her elevation, Ma continued to remain humble, economic and just, and kept to her simple habits all her life. She played an important political role and acted as a political adviser and secretary, keeping control of state documents. On several occasions, she reproached the emperor and prevented him from committing acts of injustice, such as when she prevented him from executing the academician Song Lian.

Empress Ma took great care for the wellbeing of the people, encouraging tax reductions as well as reducing the burden of heavy work obligations. She was pivotal in encouraging her husband to create a granary in the Ming capital, Nanjing, which would provide food for the families of students who were attending the national university there.

The Hongwu Emperor did not like her involvement in politics and state affairs, and attempted to curb this by establishing regulations that prohibited empresses and consorts from intervening in state affairs. He also forbade women below the rank of empress and consort from leaving the palaces unattended. Empress Ma reacted by telling her husband that as he was the father of the people, she was their mother; how then could their mother stop caring for the comfort of her children?

Famous for her humility and plain living, Ma continued wearing common clothing until they were old and worn out. She used her allowance in order to provide blankets and curtains woven of rough silk to orphans and widows, and gave leftover material to the consorts of the princes so that they would come to appreciate and value sericulture.

Death
In the fall of 1382, the empress grew ill. Before she died, she again offered counsel to her husband, that he value talent, listen to the advice of his ministers, be careful in deciding matters, and ensure he finished all he set out to do.

Empress Ma was buried at Xiaoling Mausoleum in Nanjing, and was granted the posthumous title Empress Xiaoci Zhenhua Zheshun Renhui Chengtian Yusheng Zhide Gao (孝慈貞化哲順仁徽成天育聖至德高皇后).

Titles
During the reign of the Emperor Shun of Yuan (r. 1333–1368):
Lady Ma (馬氏; from 18 July 1332 )
Primary consort
During the reign of the Hongwu Emperor (r. 1368–1398):
Empress (皇后; from 23 January 1368)
Empress Xiaoci (孝慈皇后; from 1382)
Empress Xiaoci Zhenhua Zheshun Renhui Chengtian Yusheng Zhide Gao (孝慈貞化哲順仁徽成天育聖至德高皇后; from 1398)
During the reign of the Yongle Emperor (r. 1402–1424):
Empress Xiaoci Zhaoxian Zhiren Wende Chengtian Shunsheng Gao (孝慈昭憲至仁文德承天順聖高皇后; from 1421)
During the reign of the Jiajing Emperor (r. 1521–1567):
Empress Xiaoci Zhenhua Zheshun Renhui Chengtian Yusheng Zhide Gao (慈貞化哲順仁徽成天育聖至德高皇后; from 1538)

Issue
There is no mention in her official biography that Empress Ma ever gave birth to any children. For a long period of time, it was believed she was the mother of the first five of her husband's twenty-six sons. Some modern historians believe she produced no offspring, but instead was given the emperor's first five sons to raise as her own. Thus, she
maintained good relations with her husband's concubines, ensuring impartial reprimand to those who violated the law for any reason - which she did in order to spare them from her husband's infamously cruel temper.

Ma concerned herself with the education of her sons, selecting renowned Confucian scholars for their teachers, and personally overseeing the instruction of their wives in etiquette and ritual. She ordered a compilation of the deeds of wise and virtuous empresses and consorts during the Song dynasty, as well as an observation of the palace regulations that existed during that era, which she would teach to the palace women in study groups. She had a tremendous impact on the future empress of the Yongle Emperor, Empress Xu.

As primary consort:
Zhu Biao, Crown Prince Yiwen (懿文皇太子 朱標; 10 October 1355 – 17 May 1392), the Hongwu Emperor's first son
Zhu Shuang, Prince Min of Qin (秦愍王 朱樉; 3 December 1356 – 9 April 1395), the Hongwu Emperor's second son
Zhu Gang, Prince Gong of Jin (晉恭王 朱㭎; 18 December 1358 – 30 March 1398), the Hongwu Emperor's third son
Zhu Di, the Yongle Emperor (永樂帝 朱棣; 2 May 1360 – 12 August 1424), the Hongwu Emperor's fourth son
Zhu Su, Prince Ding of Zhou (周定王 朱橚; 8 October 1361 – 2 September 1425),  the Hongwu Emperor's fifth son
Princess Ningguo (寧國公主; 1364 – 7 September 1434), the Hongwu Emperor's second daughter
Princess Anqing (安慶公主), the Hongwu Emperor's fourth daughter

In popular culture
Portrayed by Lü Liping in Empress Ma With Great Feet (大腳馬皇后) (2002)
Portrayed by Barbara Chen (陳敏兒) in Born to be a King (大明群英) (1987)
Portrayed by Ju Xue (剧雪) in Zhu Yuanzhang (朱元璋) (1993)
Portrayed by Chen Yalan ( 陳亞蘭) in The Legendary Liu Bowen (神機妙算劉伯溫) (2006–2008)
Portrayed by Ju Xue in Founding Emperor of Ming Dynasty (2006)
Portrayed by Xu Fan in Chuanqi Huangdi Zhu Yuanzhang (2006)

References

|-

1332 births
1382 deaths
Ming dynasty empresses
Yongle Emperor
Burials in Nanjing
14th-century Chinese women
14th-century Chinese people
People from Suzhou